These are the official results of the Men's 100 metres Butterfly event at the 1993 FINA Short Course World Championships held in Palma de Mallorca, Spain.

Finals

Qualifying heats

See also
1992 Men's Olympic Games 100m Butterfly
1993 Men's European LC Championships 100m Butterfly

References
 Results
 swimrankings

B
Men's 100 metre butterfly